Luiza Monteiro (born 23 November 1988) is a Brazilian submission grappler and 2nd degree black belt Brazilian jiu-jitsu competitor. She has won gold medals in the Gi at all four major events and in no-gi at three of the four major events.

Biography 
Luiza Monteiro was born on 23 November 1988, in Salvador, Bahia, Brazil. Her family moved to Niterói when she was a baby.
Monteiro began training around 13 years old and passed through various schools before receiving her Black Belt in 2010 from Rodrigo Cavaca.

At the beginning of 2018 Luiza joined the Atos Jiu-Jitsu Team in San Diego California where she now trains alongside competitors such as Andre Galvao, Kaynan Duarte and Lucas Barbosa.

Competitive style 
Luiza is known for her leglocks, footlocks and toeholds finishing three opponents during her Gold medal winning campaign at the 2016 Euros.  She also finished her Semi-final opponent at the San Francisco open 2018 with a toehold.

Competitive summary 
Main Achievements (Black Belt)
 IBJJF World Champion (2015 / 2017)
 IBJJF World Champion No-Gi (2012 / 2013 / 2014)
 IBJJF Pan Champion (2011 / 2013 / 2014 / 2016 / 2018 / 2019 / 2020 / 2021)
 IBJJF Pan Champion No-Gi (2014)
 IBJJF Brazilian Nationals Champion (2011 / 2012 / 2013 / 2015)
 IBJJF European Open Champion (2019 / 2023)
 IBJJF NYC Pro Champion (2014)
 IBJJF Queen Of Mats winner (2019)
 2nd place IBJJF Brazilian Nationals (2015)
 2nd place IBJJF Pan Championship (2015)
 2nd place IBJJF World Championship (2011 / 2012 / 2014 / 2018 / 2019 / 2021)
 2nd place IBJJF European Open (2019)
 2nd place 3CG Kumite 7 Grand Prix (2020)
 3rd place IBJJF World Championship (2014 / 2012)
 3rd place IBJJF World Championship No-Gi (2012 / 2013 / 2014)
 3rd place IBJJF Pan Championship (2011 / 2012 / 2013)
 3rd place IBJJF Brazilian Nationals (2013)

Main Achievements (Colored Belts):
 2nd place IBJJF Pan American Championship (2010 brown)
 3rd place IBJJF World Championship (2010 brown)

Instructor lineage 
Carlos Gracie > Carlson Gracie > Élcio Figueiredo > Rodrigo Cavaca > Luiza Monteiro:

Notes

References 

Brazilian practitioners of Brazilian jiu-jitsu
Living people
1988 births
People awarded a black belt in Brazilian jiu-jitsu
Brazilian jiu-jitsu world champions (women)
World No-Gi Brazilian Jiu-Jitsu Championship medalists
Sportspeople from Salvador, Bahia